John Hack (November 26, 1842 – March 29, 1933) was a decorated hero of the Union Army in the American Civil War. He was born in Hessen, Germany and lived in Adrian, Michigan.

Medal
According to the Military Times Hall of Valor, "on 3 May 1863, while serving with Company B, 47th Ohio Infantry, in action at Vicksburg, Mississippi. Private Hack was one of a party which volunteered and attempted to run the enemy's batteries with a steam tug and two barges loaded with subsistence stores." Hodges and nine others in Company B did this while Confederate States Army batteries were shooting at them "under cover of darkness" Hodges was awarded the Medal of Honor "for extreme bravery under fire" on December 31, 1907.

Rank and organization: Private, Company B, 47th Ohio Infantry. Place and date: At Vicksburg, MS., May 3, 1863

Citation:

Was one of a party which volunteered and attempted to run the enemy's batteries with a steam tug and 2 barges loaded with subsistence stores.

Post War
Hack returned to Ohio and married Delphina Cooley (1845-1921). They had three children: Dora Delphina Hack Ripper (1865–1918), William Dunhain Hack (1869–1948), and Lenora Grace Hack Chastene (1875–1910). At his death, only his son and daughter-in-law survived him.

See also
Siege of Vicksburg
47th Ohio Volunteer Infantry Regiment
List of Medal of Honor recipients
List of American Civil War Medal of Honor recipients: G–L

Notes

References

External links
Civil War Index: 47th Ohio Infantry Soldier Roster
Civil War Index: 47th Ohio Infantry in the American Civil War

1842 births
1933 deaths
Hessian emigrants to the United States
Union Army soldiers
German-born Medal of Honor recipients
United States Army Medal of Honor recipients
American Civil War recipients of the Medal of Honor
People from Adrian, Michigan